Aizpute is a town in western Latvia's South Kurzeme Municipality in the valley of the Tebra River,  northeast of Liepāja.

History

The territory of modern Aizpute was inhabited by ancient Curonians since the 9th century. St. John Lutheran church was built on the Curonian hillfort.
In the 13th century during the Livonian crusade, the territory of Aizpute was conquered by German crusaders. In 1248 the master of the Livonian Order Dietrich von Grüningen ordered the building of a stone castle in Aizpute. The castle and the whole settlement became known as Hasenpoth.
After the partition of Courland in 1253 Aizpute became part of the Bishopric of Courland.
In 1260 Aizpute church was built.

Bishop of Courland Otto granted Magdeburg rights to Aizpute in 1378.

In the second half of the 16th century Aizpute experienced rapid development because the Tebra river was used as the main trade route for the merchants of Aizpute who shipped their cargo down to the sea. After the Polish-Swedish war all trade and shipping infrastructure was destroyed and Aizpute started to experience decline. During the period 1611-1795 it was under the power of the Polish–Lithuanian Commonwealth as a capital of the semi-autonomous Powiat Piltynski (District of Piltene).

In 1795 Aizpute and the whole of Courland was incorporated into the Russian Empire and became part of the Courland Governorate.
During the Russian revolution of 1905 Aizpute was one of the places where local revolutionists showed armed resistance to Cossack punitive units. It led to the so-called Aizpute War.

During the period of the Republic of Latvia, Aizpute became the centre of a district, but in the Soviet period it became incorporated into Liepāja District.
In 2009 Aizpute became the centre of Aizpute Municipality.

Its current name is the Lettization of the German one and is officially in use since 1917.

Notable people
Heinrich Blumenthal (physician) (1804–1881), Baltic German physician
Eduard von Keyserling (1855–1918), Baltic German writer, born at nearby Tāšu-Padure Manor
Tatjana Barbakoff (1899–1944), ballet dancer
Pēteris Vasks (born 1946), contemporary Latvian composer
Ingrīda Circene (born 1956), politician, former Latvian Minister of Health
Mārtiņš Freimanis (1977–2011), musician and actor, spent his childhood in Aizpute
Anton Zabolotny (born 1991), Russian footballer

Twin towns — sister cities

Aizpute is twinned with:
 Schwerzenbach, Switzerland
 Karlskrona, Sweden

See also
List of cities in Latvia

References

External links

 Photographs of the town in 2007

 
Towns in Latvia
1378 establishments in Europe
Castles of the Teutonic Knights
Aizpute County
South Kurzeme Municipality
Courland